Stevie is a 1978 British biographical film directed by Robert Enders, and starring Glenda Jackson, Trevor Howard, Mona Washbourne, and Alec McCowen. It was based on the play Stevie by Hugh Whitemore.

Plot
The film is about the life of the British poet Stevie Smith (played by Glenda Jackson), and centres on Smith's relationship with her aunt (Mona Washbourne), with whom she lived for many years in a house in Palmers Green, London.

Cast
 Glenda Jackson as Stevie
 Trevor Howard as The Man
 Mona Washbourne as Aunt
 Alec McCowen as Freddy
 Emma Louise Fox as Stevie as child

Release and reception
Studios that distributed the film included The Samuel Goldwyn Company in the U.S., Hoyts in Australia, and Universal Pictures internationally.

Film critic Roger Ebert rated the film a perfect 4 out of 4 stars, and wrote "It contains one of Glenda Jackson's greatest performances. She knows this character well... She does what great actors can do: She takes a character who might seem uninteresting, and makes us care deeply about the uneventful days of her life."

Awards and nominations

References

External links
 
 

1978 films
British biographical films
Films shot at EMI-Elstree Studios
British films based on plays
1970s English-language films
1970s British films